Wyalusing is an unincorporated community located in the town of Wyalusing, Grant County, Wisconsin, United States. Pioneer Robert Glenn, Sr. is credited with naming the area "Wyalusing" after Wyalusing, Pennsylvania, because of a perceived resemblance.

Notes

Unincorporated communities in Grant County, Wisconsin
Unincorporated communities in Wisconsin